"Blast Off" is a song by French house music producer and disc jockey (DJ) David Guetta and Australian singer and DJ Kaz James. It was released as a digital download on 9 June 2014. The song was written by Guetta, James, Ralph Wegner, Ebow Graham, Pavan Mukhi, and Giorgio Tuinfort. It features uncredited vocals by Ebow Graham (better known as Metropolis of Foreign Beggars), with additional uncredited guitar performed by Michael Nadeau. The composition is largely based upon the original instrumentation of the song "Ain't Talkin' 'bout Love", by Van Halen. In 2014, "Blast Off" was included in Guetta's Lovers on the Sun EP. The track was also featured on the original motion picture soundtrack of the 2015 film Furious 7. It was later included in the 2015 re-release of Guetta's sixth studio album, entitled Listen Again as a bonus track.

Music video
The animated lyric video, directed by Olivier Boscovitch, was published onto YouTube through Fifth Harmony's official channel on 14 June 2013. Following the comic strip theme used for previous singles "Miss Movin' On" and "Me and My Girls", it features a skateboarding, guitar-playing girl who runs away from home.

Track listing

Charts

References

2014 singles
2014 songs
David Guetta songs
Kaz James songs
Songs written by David Guetta
Songs written by Giorgio Tuinfort
Parlophone singles
Song recordings produced by David Guetta
Songs written by Alex Van Halen
Songs written by Eddie Van Halen
Songs written by David Lee Roth
Songs written by Michael Anthony (musician)